Lieutenant General Nils Birger Valdemar Personne (29 June 1918 – 26 August 2013) was a Swedish Air Force officer. Personne's senior commands includes Vice Chief of the Air Staff (1961–1966), commander of the 4th Air Group (1966), chief of staff of the Upper Norrland Military District (1966–1972), and Commanding General, Upper Norrland Military District (1972–1976) and the Western Military District (1976–1980).

Early life
Personne was born on 29 June 1918 in Örebro, Sweden, the son of Birger Personne, a high school principal, and his wife Rut Eriksson. In the autumn of 1936, Personne began to think about the future and in that context it was a friend who suggested that he should apply to the Swedish Air Force, which he also did. Alarmingly poor blood pressure values at the medical examination in connection with the admission tests could have put a stop to continued flight plans. An understanding doctor, however, had Personne repeat the test the next day, when the traces of a "proper" graduation party disappeared from the body. Once at the Swedish Air Force Flying School in Ljungbyhed, Personne flew the Sk 12 and passed training. For a time they were stationed in Trollhättan and flew over the Skagerrak and Kattegat in a 4.5-hour pass over the sea, and witnessed, among other things, how the Gertrud Bratt was sunk by the German submarine  with two torpedoes on 24 September 1939. Personne graduated first in his class at the officer candidate school, first in the cadet school and second at the Swedish Air Force Flying School.

Career
Personne was commissioned as an officer in the Swedish Air Force on 20 April 1940 with the rank of second lieutenant. Personne served within the Västmanland Wing (F 1) from 1940 to 1945, flying the B 3. He was promoted to lieutenant in 1942. He attended the higher course at the Royal Swedish Air Force Staff College from 1945 to 1947 when he was promoted to captain and was posted to the Organizational Department in the Air Staff the same year. Personne was promoted to major in 1951 and served as a teacher at the Royal Swedish Air Force Staff College from 1951 to 1955. In 1953 he was severely affected by that year's polio epidemic. Personne had been one of the 800 in Stockholm who were affected by the last epidemic but nevertheless managed to return as a pilot after just over a year of rehabilitation.

In 1955, Personne attended the Swedish National Defence College and the year after he was promoted to lieutenant colonel. He then served in the Swedish National Defence College from 1956 to 1959 when he was promoted to colonel and appointed commander of the Södermanland Wing (F 11) in Nyköping. Two years later, Personne was appointed head of Section 2 in the Air Staff and Vice Chief of the Air Staff and in 1966 he became commander of the 4th Air Group (Fjärde flygeskadern, E 4). The unit was disbanded the same year and Personne was appointed chief of staff in the Upper Norrland Military District with the rank of major general. He served in this position for 6 years before being promoted to lieutenant general and appointed military commander of the Upper Norrland Military District in 1972. He then served as military commander of the Western Military District in Skövde from 1976 until he left active service in 1980. In total, during his time in the Swedish Air Force, Personne flew 33 types of aircraft, versions not counted. He also flew three types of helicopters and gliders.

Later life
After his retirement from the military, Personne worked for Nyge Aero in Nyköping from 1981 to 1988, to build the target towing for the Swedish Armed Forces. He was one of the initiators of creating F11's aviation museum in Nyköping. Personne was also chairman of the Swedish Aviation Historical Society (Svensk flyghistorisk förening, SFF) for four years and was one of the initiators of the formation of Nyköping's Aviation History Association (NFF) and was the association's first chairman.

Personal life
In 1943, he married Karin Tengstrand (1920–2018). They had two children: Anders (born 1945) and Bo (born 1949).

Personne was a member of the Rotary International.

Death
Personne died on 26 August 2013 in Nyköping Saint Nicholas Parish (Nyköpings Sankt Nicolai församling) in Nyköping, Södermanland County. He was interred at Galärvarvskyrkogården in Stockholm on 13 November 2013.

Dates of rank
1940 – Second Lieutenant
1942 – Lieutenant
1947 – Captain
1951 – Major
1956 – Lieutenant Colonel
1959 – Colonel
1966 – Major General
1972 – Lieutenant General

Awards and decorations
  Commander Grand Cross of the Order of the Sword (6 June 1973)
   Commander 1st Class of the Order of the Sword (6 June 1966)
  Knight 1st Class of the Order of the Sword (1952)
   Swedish Women's Voluntary Defence Organization Royal Medal of Merit in silver
   Swedish Central Federation for Voluntary Military Training Medal of Merit in silver

Honours
Member of the Royal Swedish Academy of War Sciences (1963)

Footnotes

References

1918 births
2013 deaths
Swedish Air Force lieutenant generals
People from Örebro
Commanders Grand Cross of the Order of the Sword
Members of the Royal Swedish Academy of War Sciences
Burials at Galärvarvskyrkogården
Swedish people of Belgian descent